|}
{| class="collapsible collapsed" cellpadding="0" cellspacing="0" style="clear:right; float:right; text-align:center; font-weight:bold;" width="280px"
! colspan="3" style="border:1px solid black; background-color: #77DD77;" | Also Ran

The 2003 Epsom Derby was a horse race which took place at Epsom Downs on Saturday 7 June 2003. It was the 224th running of the Derby, and it was won by Kris Kin. The winner was ridden by Kieren Fallon and trained by Sir Michael Stoute. The pre-race favourite Refuse To Bend finished thirteenth.

Race details
 Sponsor: Vodafone
 Winner's prize money: £852,600
 Going: Good
 Number of runners: 20
 Winner's time: 2m 33.35s

Full result

* The distances between the horses are shown in lengths or shorter. shd = short-head; hd = head; nk = neck.† Trainers are based in Great Britain unless indicated.

Winner's details
Further details of the winner, Kris Kin:

 Foaled: 5 March 2000 in Kentucky, US
 Sire: Kris S.; Dam: Angel in My Heart (Rainbow Quest)
 Owner: Saeed Suhail
 Breeder: Flaxman Holdings Ltd
 Rating in 2003 International Classifications: 122

Form analysis

Two-year-old races 
Notable runs by the future Derby participants as two-year-olds in 2002.

 The Great Gatsby – 6th Beresford Stakes, 4th Racing Post Trophy, 4th Critérium de Saint-Cloud
 Alamshar – 1st Beresford Stakes
 Norse Dancer – 4th Vintage Stakes, 4th Royal Lodge Stakes, 7th Racing Post Trophy
 Dutch Gold – 9th Royal Lodge Stakes
 Graikos – 3rd Prix des Chênes, 1st Prix de Condé, 9th Critérium de Saint-Cloud
 Magistretti – 2nd Superlative Stakes, 5th Royal Lodge Stakes
 Summerland – 9th Vintage Stakes, 10th Champagne Stakes, 2nd Critérium de Saint-Cloud
 Alberto Giacometti – 1st Critérium de Saint-Cloud
 Refuse to Bend – 1st National Stakes
 Brian Boru – 2nd Beresford Stakes, 1st Racing Post Trophy
 Unigold – 6th Royal Lodge Stakes
 Prince Nureyev – 4th Chesham Stakes

The road to Epsom
Early-season appearances in 2003 and trial races prior to running in the Derby.

 Kris Kin – 1st Dee Stakes
 The Great Gatsby – 2nd Derrinstown Stud Derby Trial
 Alamshar – 2nd Ballysax Stakes, 1st Derrinstown Stud Derby Trial
 Norse Dancer – 3rd 2,000 Guineas
 Balestrini – 1st Ballysax Stakes, 4th Prix Lupin
 Dutch Gold – 2nd Easter Stakes, 1st Chester Vase
 Let Me Try Again – 2nd Lingfield Derby Trial
 Graikos – 5th Dante Stakes
 Magistretti – 1st Feilden Stakes, 1st Dante Stakes
 Shield – 1st Sandown Classic Trial
 Summerland – 6th Sandown Classic Trial, 2nd Chester Vase
 Alberto Giacometti – 3rd Ballysax Stakes, 3rd Prix Lupin
 Refuse to Bend – 1st Leopardstown 2,000 Guineas Trial Stakes, 1st 2,000 Guineas
 Franklins Gardens – 1st Blue Riband Trial Stakes, 1st Lingfield Derby Trial
 Dunhill Star – 2nd Feilden Stakes, 3rd Dante Stakes
 Brian Boru – 3rd Derrinstown Stud Derby Trial
 Strength 'n Honour – 3rd Sandown Classic Trial
 Unigold – 2nd Predominate Stakes
 Lundy's Lane – 7th UAE Derby, 2nd Craven Stakes, 19th 2,000 Guineas, 3rd Derby Italiano

Subsequent Group 1 wins
Group 1 / Grade I victories after running in the Derby.

 Alamshar – Irish Derby (2003), King George VI and Queen Elizabeth Stakes (2003)
 Magistretti – Man o' War Stakes (2004)
 Refuse to Bend – Queen Anne Stakes (2004), Eclipse Stakes (2004)
 Brian Boru – St. Leger (2003)

Subsequent breeding careers
Leading progeny of participants in the 2003 Epsom Derby.

Sires of Classic winners
Refuse To Bend (13th)
 Sarafina - 1st Prix de Diane (2010)
 Wavering - 1st Prix Saint-Alary (2011)
 Refuse To Bobbin - 1st Premio Presidente della Repubblica (2014)
 Ned Buntline - 2nd Johnny Henderson Grand Annual Chase (2014)

Sires of National Hunt horses
Brian Boru (16th)
 Fox Norton - 1st Melling Chase (2017)
 Sub Lieutenant - 2nd Melling Chase (2017)
 Shotgun Paddy - 1st Classic Chase (2014)
 Bold Sir Brian - 1st Premier Kelso Hurdle (2011)
Norse Dancer (4th)
 Yanworth - 1st Christmas Hurdle (2016), 1st Liverpool Hurdle (2017)
 Magic Dancer - 2nd Betfair Hurdle (2019) 
 Norse King - 1st Prix du Conseil de Paris (2013)
 Dorcas Lane - 3rd Ribblesdale Stakes (2011)
Alberto Giacometti (12th)
 Une Artiste - 1st Fred Winter Juvenile Novices' Handicap Hurdle (2012)
 Montbazon - 3rd Vincent O'Brien County Handicap Hurdle (2014)
 Dans La Foulee - 1st Prix Wild Monarch (Pouliches)
 Solivate - Dam of Energy d'Olivate (3rd Prix Amadou 2018)

Other Stallions
Kris Kin (1st) - Sired fairly useful flat and jumps winners before being exported to ItalyAlamshar (3rd) - Exported to Japan - Relocated to Ireland - Returned to Japan - Minor flat and jumps winnersThe Great Gatsby (2nd) - Exported to RussiaBalestrini (5th) - Exported to AustraliaGraikos (8th) - Exported to IranMagistretti (9th) - Exported to IndiaFranklins Gardens (14th) - Minor jumps runnersDunhill Star (15th) - Exported to Pakistan

References
 
 sportinglife.com
 

Epsom Derby
 2003
Epsom Derby
Epsom Derby
2000s in Surrey